Sri Kalyana Venkateswara swamy Temple is an ancient Hindu temple at Srinivasamangapuram in Tirupati. It is located in Tirupati District of Andhra Pradesh, India. The temple is dedicated to Lord Venkateswara, a form of Vishnu and is referred to as Kalyana Venkateswara. The temple is categorised as an Ancient monument of National importance by Archaeological survey of India. It is one of the centrally protected monuments of national importance.

The ancient temple of Sri Kalyana Venkateswara Swamy is located in Srinivasa Mangapuram, about 10 km in the west part of Tirupati city. This ancient temple which is under the control of Archaeological Survey of India (ASI) is maintained by Tirumala Tirupati Devasthanams since 1967 and utsavams and rituals in this temple are being performed since 1981.

Today, Sri Kalyana Venkateswara Swamy temple is considered sacred, next to Tirumala temple. Those who are unable to make it to Tirumala can have darshan of Lord Sri Kalyana Venkateswara Swamy to fulfill their wish. As the name indicates, this temple carries significance for newlywed couples. Newlyweds offer prayers first in this temple as this is the place where Lord Sri Kalyana Venkateswara Swamy with Goddess Padmavathi Devi stayed for six months, just after their wedding.

Administration 

The temple was under the control of Archaeological Survey of India (ASI) from 1967 to 1981. In 1981 the temple was handed over to Tirumala Tirupati Devasthanams. At present the temple is being administered by Tirumala Tirupati Devasthanams(TTD).

Deities in the temple 

The presiding deity of the temple is Venkateswara who is referred to as Kalyana Venkateswara. The deity will be facing west and is in standing posture with four hands with left two hands one in varada mudra and one holding Chakra and right two hands one in kati mudra and the other holding Shankha.

The temple also hosts the deities of Lakshmi Narayana swamy and  Sri Ranganatha swamy.

Significance 
The temple is considered to be sacred next to Sri Venkateswara Temple in Tirumala. The temple is recognised as Ancient monument of National importance by Archaeological survey of India.

See also 
Hindu Temples in Tirupati
List of temples under Tirumala Tirupati Devasthanams
List of Monuments of National Importance in Andhra Pradesh
Venkateswara Temple, Tirumala

References 

Tirumala Tirupati Devasthanams
Tirupati
Vishnu temples
State protected monuments in Andhra Pradesh